The Queen of Attolia is a young adult fantasy novel by Megan Whalen Turner, published by the Greenwillow Books imprint of William Morrow in 2000 (later, of HarperCollins). It is the second novel in the Queen's Thief series that Turner inaugurated with The Thief in 1996.

Setting 

The book is set in an imaginary landscape reminiscent of Ancient Greece and other territories around the Mediterranean, particularly Italy. The action takes place in the fictional countries of Eddis, Attolia, and Sounis. The characters’ names are also Greek, and references are made to actual Greek Classical literature, although the world is fantasy based on various European cultures. The gods of their pantheon are fictional, but as the world’s prime goddess Hephestia‘s name suggests, much is modeled after Greek mythology [i.e., Hephaestus); yet the fantasy world possesses such items from later European cultures such as guns, pocket watches, printed books and stained glass windows.

Plot summary 

Eugenides, the Thief of Eddis, has been caught spying on the Queen of Attolia. He expects to be hanged, but the Queen instead resorts to an ancient traditional punishment for thievery and has his right hand struck off with a sword. Eugenides returns to Eddis and wallows in a deep depression. Attolia is a seemingly heartless ruler but secretly regrets her action.

The countries of Eddis and Attolia are soon at war, with neighboring Sounis playing both sides. Also manipulating the situation is Attolia’s ambassador from the Mede Empire, Nahuseresh, who pays extravagant attention to the beautiful Queen of Attolia while serving his own agenda. Attolia juggles her overattentive ambassador, the rebellious barons who do not believe a woman can rule alone, and a bloody, costly war.

Meanwhile, a visit from the magus of Sounis awakens Eugenides to the fact that his country is at war. His cousin, the Queen of Eddis, may lose her throne and country, forcing him to take on a new role. Eugenides  begins to scheme, appearing to shutter his heart just as Attolia has. Eugenides succeeds in stealing the Magus from Sounis, and temporarily turning Sounis and Attolia against each other. This gives the tiny country of Eddis a small break as Sounis and Attolia focus on each other instead of Eddis.

Reviews 

The Queen of Attolia received starred reviews from the Horn Book, Kirkus Reviews, and Publishers Weekly, as well as favorable reviews in other review publications.

Queen's Thief series 

 1996 The Thief
 2000 The Queen of Attolia
 2006 The King of Attolia
 2010 A Conspiracy of Kings
 2017 Thick as Thieves
 2020 Return of the Thief

References

External links 

Megan Whalen Turner (official)
Sounis fan discussion of the series at LiveJournal
 

2001 American novels
Young adult fantasy novels
American fantasy novels
American young adult novels
2001 fantasy novels

Greenwillow Books books